Episcepsis phlebitis is a moth of the family Erebidae. It was described by Paul Dognin in 1913. It is found in Belize.

References

Euchromiina
Moths described in 1913